Vijayalalitha or Vijaya Lalitha was an Indian actress who appeared in Telugu, Tamil, Malayalam, Kannada and Hindi films in the 1960s and 1970s. She is best known for her appearances in Rani Mera Naam (1972), Baazigar (1972) and Saakshi (1967). She is also the aunt of Vijayashanti, Telugu superstar actress turned politician.

Early life and background
Vijayalalitha is relative to actress Vijayashanti. Vijayashanti is the daughter of Vijayalalitha's elder sister. Vijaya lalitha acted in 860 movies.

Career
Lalitha starred in many Telugu films in the 1960s and 1970s. She also starred in Tamil, Malayalam, Kannada and a few Hindi movies, such as Sadhu Aur Shaitaan, Rani Mera Naam and Hathkadi. She was well known as the "Female James Bond" in the Tamil and Telugu industries and was frequently paired with "South India James Bond" actor Jaishankar in many Tamil movies. Her dance and song sequence "Palinginal Oru Maalikai" from Vallavan Oruvan is known as an evergreen until now. Some of her memorable Tamil movies together with Jaishankar are Neelagiri Express, Kannan Varuvan, Kalam Vellum, Mappilai Azhaippu, Nootrukku Nooru, Nil Gavani Kadhali, Akka Thangai, Pattanathil Bhootham, Vallavan Oruvan, Ner Vazhi, Delhi To Madras and more. She acted in several female-oriented movies and is known for her punctuality in film sets. She regularly acted with N. T. Rama Rao and Akkeneni Nageswara Rao in Telugu movies. She produced the Telugu movie, Oka Naari Vanda Thupaakulu (1973) and cast herself as the heroine as well. She was very famous at her career peak in 1977 to 1981, receiving more movies. Within the short period, she created sensation as an action heroine. In some of the Tamil movies she appeared as an arrogant and negative roles. She acted opposite Nagesh in Then Kinnam, Hello Partner and with M. G. Ramachandran in Kadhal Vaaganam. She portrayed "Sheela", an arrogant girl in Shanti Nilayam. Throughout 3 decades, Vijayalalitha acted in 860 movies majoring all 4 South Indian and Hindi languages as well.

Selected filmography
In order of languages in which she acted the most to fewest  films.

Telugu

 Bheemanjaneya Yuddham (1966)
 Aggi Dora (1967)
 Aggimeedha Guggilam
 Bhakta Prahlada (1967)
 Chikkadu Dorakadu (1967)
 Devuni Gelichina Manavudu (1967)
 Gudachari 116 (1967)
 Peddakkayya (1967)
 Premalo Pramaadam (1967)
 Private Master (1967)
 Raktha Sindhooram (1967)
 Saakshi (1967)
 Veera Pooja (1967)
 Aggi Meeda Guggilam (1968)
 Amayakudu (1968)
 Baghdad Gaja Donga (1968)
 Bangaru Sankellu (1968)
 Bhale Monagadu (1968)
 Bharya (1968)
 Devudichina Bhartha (1968)
 Kalisochina Adrushtam (1968)
 Kumkuma Barani (1968)
 Nadamanthrapu Siri (1968)
 Nindu Samsaram (1968)
 Ninne Pellaaduthaa (1968)
 Pedaraasi Peddamma katha (1968)
 Talli Tandrulu (1968)
 Adrustavanthulu (1969)
 Aggi Veerudu (1969)
 Bhale Rangadu (1969)
 Bommalu Cheppina Katha (1969)
 Gandara Gandadu (1969)
 Jagath Kilaadeelu (1969)
 Kadaladu Vadaladu (1969)
 Mathru Devatha (1969)
 Akka Chellelu (Telugu, 1969) as Asha, dancer
 Panchakalyani Dongala Rani (1969)
 Sattekaalapu Satteyya (1969)
 Koothuru Kodalu
 Takkari Donga Chakkani Chukka (1969)
 Aasthulu Anthasthulu(1969)
 Basti Kilaadeelu (1970)
 Bhale Ettu Chivaraku Chithu (1970)
 Jagath Jetteelu (1970)
 Basti Kilaadeelu (1970)
 Maa Naanna Nirdhoshi (1970)
 Merupu Veerudu (1970)
 Pacchani Samsaram (1970)
 Paga Saadhistaa (1970)
 Pasidi Manasulu (1970)
 Pettandarulu (1970)
 Suguna Sundari Katha (1970)
 Thaali Bottu (1970) as Lalitha
 Yamalokapu Goodhachari (1970)
 Kodalu Diddina Kapuram (1970)
 Ukku Pidugu
 Sapthaswaralu
 Andariki Monagaadu (1971)
 Chalaki Rani Kilaadi Raja (1971)
 Roudeelaku Roudeelu (1971)
 James Bond 777 (1971)
 Kathiki Kankanam (1971)
 Basti Bulbul (1971) as Pratima
 Revolver Rani (1971)
 Bullemma Bullodu (1972)
 Badi Panthulu (1972) as Jaya, wife of Krishnam Raju
 Manuvu Manasu (1973)
 Oka Naari Vanda Thupaakulu (1973) -  producer as well
 Mallamma Katha (1973)
 Doctor Babu (1973)
 Palleturi Chinnodu (1974)
 Manushullo Devudu (1974)
 Chairman Chalamayya (1974)
 Aradhana (1976)
 Aalu Magalu (1977)
 Kamalamma Kamatham (1979)
 Devudu Mamayya (1981)
 Aadadaani Sawaal (1983)
 Pasidi Manasulu (1990)
 Naa Pellaam Naa Ishtam (1991)
 Chinna Rayudu (1992) as Kameswari
 Mother India (1993)
 Sahasa Veerudu Sagara Kanya (1996) as Mantrala Maanchaala
 Jailorgari Abbayi
 Mooga Prema (1975)

Tamil
This list is incomplete; you can help by expanding it.

 Valli Vara Pora (1995)
 Athisaya Piravi (1989)
 Senthoora Poove (1988)
 Visha Kanni (1985)
 Thunichalkari (1982)
 CID Vijaya (1980)
 Nallathoru Kudumbam (1979)
 Suprabatham (1979)
 Ungalil Oruthi (1976)
 Jai Balaji (1976)
 Hotel Sorgam (1975)
 Kai Niraya Kaasu (1974)
 Enna Muthalali Soukkiyama (1972)
 Delhi To Madras (1972)
 Mappilai Azhaippu (1972)
 Kannan Varuvan (1972)
 Savaluku Saval (1972)
 Hello Partner (1972)
 Gun Fight Kanchana (1972)
 Nangu Suvargal (1971)
 Nootrukku Nooru (1971)
 Then Kinnam (1971)
 Meendum Vazhven (1971)
 Ethiroli (1970)
 Kalyana Oorvalam (1970)
 Kalam Vellum (1970)
 Namma Veettu Deivam (1970)
 Patham Pasali (1970)
 Revolver Reeta (1970)
 Sorgam (1970)
 Thirudan (1969)
 Nil Gavani Kadhali (1969)
 Shanti Nilayam (1969)
 Anjal Petti 520 (1969)
 Akka Thangai (1969)
 Ner Vazhi (1968)
 Kadhal Vaaganam (1968)
 Neelagiri Express (1968)
 Ethirigal Jakkirathai (1967)
 Bhakta Prahlada (1967)
 Pattanathil Bhootham (1967)
 Vallavan Oruvan (1966)
 Kathal Paduthum Padu (1966)
 Kaattumaina (1963)

Malayalam

 Eettappuli (1983)
 Sanchari (1981)
 Iniyum Kaanaam (1979)
 Vijayam Nammude Senani (1979)
 Ponnil Kulicha Rathri (1979)
 Avalude Prathikaram (1979)
 Ithaanente Vazhi (1978)
 Thacholi Ambu (1978)
 Black Belt (1978)
 Aalmaaraattam (1978)
 Ashokavanam (1978)
 Society Lady (1978)
 Puthariyankam (1978)
 Snehikkan Samayamilla (1978)
 Paavaadakkaari (1978)
 Pattalam Janaki (1977)
 Penpuli (1977)
 Kannappanunni (1977)
 Kaduvaye Pidicha Kiduva (1977)
 Alibabayum 41 Kallanmaarum (1975)
 Pennpada (1975) as Sreedevi & Geetha (Double Role)
 Arakkallan Mukkalkkallan (1974)
 Vrindavanam (1974)
 Saraswathi (1970)
 Mister Kerala (1969)
 Viplavakarikal (1968) as Radha
 Cochin Express (1967)
 Sheelavathi (1967)

Kannada

 Parvathi Kalyana (1967)
 Devara Gedda Manava (1967)
 Jedara Bale (1968)
 Bangalore Mail (1968)
 Choori Chikkanna (1969)
 Chikkamma (1969)
 Paropakari (1970)
 Rangamahal Rahasya (1970)
 Modala Rathri (1970)
 Bidugade (1973)
 Viplava Vanithe (1975)
 Kalla Kulla (1975)
 Banashankari (1977)
 Sose Tanda Soubhagya  (First cinema scope Kannada film 1977)
 Bhoolokadalli Yamaraja (1979)
 Mallige Hoove (1992)

Hindi
 Sadhu Aur Shaitan (1968)
 Rani Mera Naam (1972) as rani
 Shri Ram Vanvas (1977)
 Lok Parlok (1979)
 Hathkadi (1995) as Latha (Major's wife)

References

External links

 Vijayalalitha-M3db
 മധുവിന്റെ പ്രമുഖ നായികമാർ
 Roudeelaku Roudeelu Full Movie in YouTube

Living people
Indian film actresses
Actresses in Hindi cinema
Actresses in Kannada cinema
Actresses in Tamil cinema
Actresses in Telugu cinema
Actresses in Malayalam cinema
20th-century Indian actresses
Year of birth missing (living people)
Actresses from Vijayawada